Lourdes Vázquez is a Puerto Rican poet, fiction and essayist writer born in Santurce, Puerto Rico and a resident of the United States. Her poetry, short stories and essays have been published in numerous magazines and anthologies.  Her many collections, which have been translated into English and Italian by writers such as Bethany Korps-Edwards, Rosa Alcalá, Enriqueta Carrington and Brigidina Gentile have received excellent reviews. She is Librarian Emeritus of Rutgers University.

Collaborations
Vázquez has collaborated with a group of artists. Some of these collaborations include the artist's book, Salmos del cuerpo ardiente by Consuelo Gotay (2007) and the videos Meche en doble luna llena (2006) by Adál Maldonado and Cat = Cat (2006) by Andrea Hasselager. She has also collaborated twice with Yarisa Colón Torres: Cibeles que sueña=Cybele, As She Dreams (35 copies, measuring 10" length x 6" width, translated by Enriqueta Carrington and The Tango Files (35 copies, January 6, 2014, front cover by Yarisa Colón).

Awards
In 1988 Vázquez's book Las Hembras (1987) was selected by El Nuevo Día newspaper as one of the Puerto Rican ten best books of the year, and Aterrada de cuernos y cuervos, a biography of the poet Marina Arzola, received the same distinction in 1990. In 2001, Vázquez was awarded the "50 Most Distinguished Latinas in the Tri-State Area Award" by El Diario-La Prensa newspaper (NY).  She was the winner of the Juan Rulfo Short Story Award (France) in 2002.: category Literate World. In 2004, her Bestiary: Selected Poems 1986-1997 received an Honorable Mention in the ForeWord Reviews Book of the Year Awards. Bestiary was selected also as one of the  "May–June 2004 Picks"  by the Small Press Review. Her novel Sin ti no soy yo is part of The New Essential Guide to Spanish Reading (2012), compiled by the organization, America Reads Spanish and its English translation Not Myself Without You was selected as part of LatinoStories.com's "2013 Top Ten New Latino Authors to Watch". Vázquez was awarded the Honorable Mention for the National Poetry Series 2014 Paz Prize for Poetry as well as an Honorable Mention for the Premio Luis Lloréns Torres, Casa de los Poetas, 2014 (PR).

Archives
In 2008 the Library and Archives of the Center for Puerto Rican Studies / CUNY invited her to donate her documents.
See: Center for Puerto Rican Studies, Library and Archives, Collection Descriptions. (https://centropr.hunter.cuny.edu/collections/collection-descriptions-t-z)

Publications
 La rosa mecánica. Rio Piedras, P.R.: Ediciones Huracán, 1991. 
 Historias de Pulgarcito. Río Piedras, P.R.: Editorial Cultural, 1999. 
 Hablar sobre Julia: Julia de Burgos: bibliografía 1934- 2002. Austin, TX: SALALM Secretariat, 2002. 
 Desnudo con Huesos=Nude with Bones. La Candelaria, 2003.
 Park Slope. Duration Press 2003.
 May the transvestites of my island... Translation by Rosa Alcalá. New York: Belladona Press, 2004.
 Obituario. Babab, 2004.
 Bestiary: Selected Poems 1986-1997. Translation by Rosa Alcalá. Tempe: Bilingual Review Press, 2004. 
 La estatuilla. San Juan, PR: Cultural, 2004. 
 Salmos del cuerpo ardiente. Chihuahua Arde, 2004.
 Salmos del cuerpo ardiente: An Artist Book by Consuelo Gotay. 2007.
 Samandar: libro de viajes=Book of Travel. Translation by Enriqueta Carrington.  Buenos Aires: Tsé Tsé, 2007. 
 Tres cuentos y un infortunio. Argentina: Fundación A. Ross, 2009. 
 Compiladora antología: Narradoras latinoamericanas en Estados Unidos. Argentina: Fundación A. Ross, 2009. vol. I ; Vol II 
 Una muñeca de cerámica…=A porcelain doll.... Wheelhouse Press, 2009.
 La mujer, el pan y el pordiosero. México: Eón, 2010. 
 Sin ti no soy yo. (Second Revised Edition.) El Gallo Rojo, 2012. 
 Not Myself Without You. Translation by Bethany Korps-Edwards. Tempe, AZ: Bilingual Review Press, 2012. 
 Appunti dalla Terra Frammentata = Registros del Broken-Up Land. Translation by Manuela Derosas.  Italy: EDIBOM Edizione Letterarie, Serie Collana Isla, 2012.
 Le Extrait I. Ca: El Gallo Rojo, 2014. Translation by Philippe Burgos. 
 Adagio con fugas y ciertos afectos: mis mejores cuentos. Madrid: Editorial Verbum, 2013. 
 Un enigma esas muñecas. Madrid: Torremozas, 2015. 
 The Tango Files. Italia: Edizione Arcoiris, 2016. 
El atardecer de los planetas azules. San Juan: Los libros de la Iguana, 2018. ISBN 978-1-7325539-003
Orígenes de los eterno y así las cosas. Madrid: Verbum, 2020. ISBN 978-84--1337-356-0

See also

List of Puerto Ricans
List of Puerto Rican writers
Puerto Rican literature
Puerto Ricans in the United States

References

External links
 Ni Bárbaras ni malinches: antología de narradoras en Estados Unidos. Fernando Olszanki, ed. USA: Ars Communis, 2017. 
Miscelánea: antología poetíca. Andrés Torres Guerrero, ed. Bogotá: Colombia 2020.
Vera Alvarez, Germán y Pedro Medina León, eds. Miami (Un)plugged. Miami: Sed Ediciones, 2016.
 Rodríguez, Ileana y Mónica Szurmuk, eds. The Cambridge History of Latin American Women's Writers. Cambridge University Press, 2015.
 Torres Rodríguez, Daniel. La isla del (Des)encanto: apuntes sobre una nueva literatura boricua. Puerto Rico/Santo Domingo: Isla Negra, 2015.
 Martín Sevillano, Ana Belén. Puerto Rico indócil: Antología de cuentos portorriqueños del siglo XXI . España: Algaida, 2015.
 Cuentos puertorriqueños en el nuevo Milenio. San Juan, Puerto Rico: Los Libros de la Iguana, 2013.
 Medina Pedro, ed. Suburbano 2: [antología de cuentos]. Miami: Suburbano, 2013.
 Spahr, Juliana and Stephanie Young, eds. A Megaphone: Some Enactments, Some Numbers, and Some Essays About the Continued....Philadelphia: Chain Links, 2011.
 Hidalgo de Jesús, Amarilys, ed., "La escritura de mujeres en Puerto Rico a finales del Siglo XX y principios del Siglo XXI." Essays on Contemporary Puerto Rican Writers. NY: Edwin Mellen Press, 2012.
 Nieves, Myrna, ed. Breaking Ground: Anthology of Puerto Rican Women Writers in New York 1980-2012/Abriendo Caminos: antología de escritoras puertorriqueñas en Nueva York 1980-2012. NY: Campana, 2012.
 Varderi, Alejandro ed. Los vaivenes del lenguaje: literatura en movimiento. Madrid: Ediciones Libertarias, 2011. 
 Gentile, Brigidina, ed. La otra Penélope. Spain: ArCibel, 2010.
 Valero, Silvia. "Entre las ruinas y la descolonización: reflexiones desde la literatura del Gran Caribe." Revista Tinkuy: Boletín de investigación y debate. 13: Junio 2010. [Número especial].
 Gentile, Brigidina, ed. L’Altra Penelope: antologia di scrittici di lingua spagnola. Salerno-Milano: Oèdipus, 2008.
 Ortega, Julio and María Ramírez Ribes, eds. El hacer poético. Mexico: Universidad Veracruzana, 2008.
 Agosín, Marjorie, ed. Writing Toward Hope. New Haven and London: Yale University Press, 2007.
 Suárez Coalla, Paquita, ed. Aquí me tocó escribir: antología de escritores y escritoras latinos en Nueva York. Spain: Trabe, 2005.
 Cocco de Filippis, Daisy, and Sonia Rivera Valdés, eds. Conversación entre escritoras del Caribe Hispano. NY: CUNY, Hunter College, 2001. 2v.
 Antología de la poesía cósmica puertorriqueña. México: Frente de Afirmación Hispanista, 2003. Vol. 2.
 Nieves, Myrna, ed. Mujeres como islas: antología de narradoras cubanas, dominicanas y puertorriqueñas. Santo Domingo, Cuba: Ediciones Ferilibro y Ediciones Unión, 2002.
 Arroyo Vázquez, Elsa R. and Julia Cristina Ortíz Lugo, eds. Leer para escribir. San Juan: Playa Mayor, 1994. Santillana (eleventh ed.), 2006.
 Libertad condicional. México: La Luciérnaga, 2000.
 Dávila, Arlene, and Agustín Laó-Montes, eds. Mambo Montage: The Latinization of New York. NY: Columbia University Press, 2001.
 Newson, Adele S., and Linda Strong-Leek. Winds of Change: The Transforming Voices of Caribbean Women Writers and Scholars. Editorial Peter Lang, 1998.
 Balutansky, Kathleen M., and Marie-Agnes Sourieau, eds. Caribbean Creolization: Reflections on the Cultural Dynamics of Language, Literature And Identity. Barbados, Florida: University Press of Florida, The Press University of the West Indies, 1998.
 Not Myself Without You. Arizona State University, Bilingual Review Press Website.
 McKinney, Sandy. "Bestiary: Selected Poems 1986-1997. (Review)." ForeWord Reviews (Sept/Oct 2004).
 Directory of Poets and Writers

1959 births
Living people
American people of Puerto Rican descent
People from Santurce, Puerto Rico
Puerto Rican feminists
Puerto Rican women writers
Puerto Rican women short story writers
American women short story writers
20th-century Puerto Rican writers
20th-century Puerto Rican women writers 
21st-century Puerto Rican writers
21st-century Puerto Rican women writers
20th-century American short story writers
20th-century American women writers 
21st-century American short story writers
21st-century American women writers